Ephraim Peabody (March 22, 1807 – November 28, 1856) was an American Unitarian clergyman, preacher, and philanthropist who was one of the founders of the Provident Institution for Savings in Boston. Peabody also founded a school for adults whose education had been neglected and was otherwise largely interested in devising measures for the relief of the poor.

Biography 
Peabody was born March 22, 1807 in Wilton, New Hampshire to Ephraim Peabody II and Ruth Abbot. His father was the village blacksmith and died young in 1816, leaving his mother Ruth to raise him and his sister. He went to school for a year at Byfield Academy, then to Phillips Exeter Academy, which was at the time headed by his uncle Benjamin Abbot.

Peabody attended Bowdoin College and graduated in 1827. Afterwards he studied theology in Cambridge, Massachusetts at the Harvard Divinity School where he graduated in 1830. Soon after, he went to Meadville, Pennsylvania to tutor the family of Harm Jan Huidekoper and to begin to preach. In 1832, Peabody accepted a call to preach at the First Unitarian Church congregation in Cincinnati, Ohio. Here he began a long association with Louisville minister James Freeman Clarke with whom he started a Unitarian periodical The Western Messanger. In the summer of 1835, while visiting Boston, Massachusetts, Peabody suffered a lung hemorrhage due to tuberculosis and the death of his first son. He returned to Cincinnati, but was unable to continue his work and spent the following winter preaching in Mobile, Alabama. He resigned from the Cincinnati congregation in 1836 and spent the next winter back in Mobile.

During the summer of 1837, Peabody returned to Boston and preached at the Federal Street Church. Soon after he was offered a position at the First Congregational Society in New Bedford, Massachusetts alongside Rev. John H. Morison. While in New Bedford, Peabody lost two more children. He resigned from the New Bedford congregation in 1845 and was called to preach at King's Chapel in Boston, where he was pastor for the remainder of his life. A parishioner of Peabody's at King's Chapel said:

Peabody was often the public orator or poet for both the city of Boston and the Unitarian denomination. In 1852, Peabody delivered the commencement poem to Bowdoin College.

During 1853 he travelled in Europe to benefit his health, and spent the winter of 1855 and 1856 in St. Augustine, Florida, with the same object.

Peabody was one of the founders of the Provident Institution for Savings which was the first chartered savings bank in the United States. In Boston, Peabody was editor of The Christian Register, a Unitarian periodical journal. He also founded a school for adults whose education had been neglected and developed plans for the Boston school system.

While serving at King's Chapel, Peabody happened to marry famous Boston portrait-painter William Morris Hunt to Louise Perkins in 1855. His sermons, with a memoir, were published in 1857, and a volume of his writings, entitled Christian Days and Thoughts, was published in 1858.

Peabody suffered another lung hemorrhage in the summer of 1855 which caused him to retire from preaching. Peabody's last public appearance was later that year in 1855 where he gave a memorial sermon at his friend Judge Charles Jackson's funeral.

In 1833 Peabody married Mary Jane Derby, the daughter of Elias Hasket Derby. Together they had seven children, three of which died in childhood:

 Samuel A. Peabody (1834–1836)
 Ellen Derby Peabody (1836–1869)—married Charles William Eliot
 Anna Huidekoper Peabody (1838–1920)—married Henry Whitney Bellows
 George Derby Peabody (1840–1842)
 Emily Morison Peabody (1842–1845)
 Robert Swain Peabody (1845–1917)—notable Boston architect of Peabody & Stearns and President of the American Institute of Architects
 Rev. Francis Greenwood Peabody (1847–1936)—Unitarian minister and theology professor at Harvard University

Ephraim Peabody died in Boston, Massachusetts, on November 28, 1856 at the age of 49.

Citations

References

External links 

 An autograph book kept by Ephraim Peabody covering the period 1717-1849 and including letters from many leading Unitarians and the papers of Ephraim Peabody are in the Harvard Divinity School Library at Harvard Divinity School in Cambridge, Massachusetts.

Notes

References

External links
 An autograph book kept by Ephraim Peabody covering the period 1717-1849 and including letters from many leading Unitarians and the papers of Ephraim Peabody are in the Harvard Divinity School Library at Harvard Divinity School in Cambridge, Massachusetts. 

1807 births
1856 deaths
American clergy
Bowdoin College alumni
American Unitarians
People from Wilton, New Hampshire
Phillips Exeter Academy alumni
19th-century American clergy
Peabody family